Echinophora spinosa, the  prickly parsnip, is a species of plant in the genus Echinophora found in Europe.

References

External links
 
 

spinosa